Hit-The-Trail Holliday is a lost 1918 silent comedy film directed by Marshall Neilan and starring George M. Cohan in filmization based on his 1915 Broadway play, Hit-the-Trail-Holiday (the spelling of the play differs from the film). Cohan wrote the play for his brother-in-law Fred Niblo, who was soon to become a film director. Cohan produced the film in conjunction with Famous Players-Lasky. A film about Prohibition of Alcohol, directed by one of Hollywood's then biggest alcoholics.

Plot
As described in a film magazine, discharged because of his refusal to sell liquor to a minor, bartender Billie Holiday (Cohan), expert mixer of drinks, seeks employment in St. Johnsburg, a small town dominated by two factions, one a German brewer, the other an American prohibitionist. Pretty Edith Jason (Clayton) strengthens Billy's leanings towards the prohibitionists, and in a rousing address he is successful in making a name for himself. Before long, accompanied by Edith who is now his wife, Billy makes a tour of various cities in an endeavor to wipe out the liquor interests.

Cast
George M. Cohan as Billy Holliday
Marguerite Clayton as Edith Jason
Robert Broderick as Otto Wurst
Pat O'Malley as Kent B. Wurst
Russell Bassett as Burr Jason
Richard Barthelmess as Bobby Jason
William Walcott as Reverend Holden
Estar Banks

See also
The House That Shadows Built (1931 promotional film by Paramount); a possibility that the unnamed Cohan clip is from Hit-The-Trail Holliday.
Prohibition in the United States

References

External links

1918 films
American silent feature films
Films directed by Marshall Neilan
Lost American films
Paramount Pictures films
American films based on plays
1918 comedy films
Silent American comedy films
American black-and-white films
Films about bartenders
1918 lost films
Lost comedy films
1910s American films